Roccavivara is a comune (municipality) in the Province of Campobasso in the Italian region Molise, located about  north of Campobasso.

Roccavivara borders the following municipalities: Castelguidone, Castelmauro, Celenza sul Trigno, Montefalcone nel Sannio, San Giovanni Lipioni, Trivento.

References

Cities and towns in Molise